

Events

Pre-1600
1080 – Harald III of Denmark dies and is succeeded by Canute IV, who would later be the first Dane to be canonized.
1349 – The rule of the Bavand dynasty in Mazandaran is brought to an end by the murder of Hasan II.
1362 – Kaunas Castle falls to the Teutonic Order after a month-long siege.
1492 – Spain and Christopher Columbus sign the Capitulations of Santa Fe for his voyage to Asia to acquire spices.
1521 – Trial of Martin Luther over his teachings begins during the assembly of the Diet of Worms. Initially intimidated, he asks for time to reflect before answering and is given a stay of one day.
1524 – Giovanni da Verrazzano reaches New York harbor.

1601–1900
1797 – Sir Ralph Abercromby attacks San Juan, Puerto Rico, in what would be one of the largest invasions of the Spanish territories in the Americas. 
  1797   – Citizens of Verona begin an unsuccessful eight-day rebellion against the French occupying forces.
1861 – The state of Virginia's secession convention votes to secede from the United States, later becoming the eighth state to join the Confederate States of America.
1863 – American Civil War: Grierson's Raid begins: Troops under Union Army Colonel Benjamin Grierson attack central Mississippi.
1864 – American Civil War: The Battle of Plymouth begins: Confederate forces attack Plymouth, North Carolina.
1869 – Morelos is admitted as the 27th state of Mexico.
1876 – Catalpa rescue: The rescue of six Fenian prisoners from Fremantle Prison in Western Australia.
1895 – The Treaty of Shimonoseki between China and Japan is signed. This marks the end of the First Sino-Japanese War, and the defeated Qing Empire is forced to renounce its claims on Korea and to concede the southern portion of the Fengtian province, Taiwan and the Penghu to Japan.

1901–present
1905 – The Supreme Court of the United States decides Lochner v. New York, which holds that the "right to free contract" is implicit in the due process clause of the Fourteenth Amendment to the United States Constitution.
1907 – The Ellis Island immigration center processes 11,747 people, more than on any other day.
1912 – Russian troops open fire on striking goldfield workers in northeast Siberia, killing at least 150.
1941 – World War II: The invasion of Yugoslavia is completed when it signs an armistice with Germany and Italy.
1942 – French prisoner of war General Henri Giraud escapes from his castle prison in Königstein Fortress.
1944 – Forces of the Communist-controlled Greek People's Liberation Army attack the smaller National and Social Liberation resistance group, which surrenders. Its leader Dimitrios Psarros is murdered.
1945 – World War II: Montese, Italy, is liberated from Nazi forces.
1945 – Historian Tran Trong Kim is appointed the Prime Minister of the Empire of Vietnam.
1946 – The last French troops are withdrawn from Syria.
1951 – The Peak District becomes the United Kingdom's first National Park.
1961 – Bay of Pigs Invasion: A group of Cuban exiles financed and trained by the CIA lands at the Bay of Pigs in Cuba with the aim of ousting Fidel Castro.
1969 – Sirhan Sirhan is convicted of assassinating Robert F. Kennedy.
  1969   – Communist Party of Czechoslovakia chairman Alexander Dubček is deposed.
1970 – Apollo program: The ill-fated Apollo 13 spacecraft returns to Earth safely.
1971 – The Provisional Government of Bangladesh is formed.
1975 – The Cambodian Civil War ends. The Khmer Rouge captures the capital Phnom Penh and Cambodian government forces surrender.
1978 – Mir Akbar Khyber is assassinated, provoking the Saur Revolution in Afghanistan.
1982 – Constitution Act, 1982 Patriation of the Canadian constitution in Ottawa by Proclamation of Elizabeth II, Queen of Canada.
1986 – An alleged state of war lasting 335 years between the Netherlands and the Isles of Scilly declared peace bringing an end to any hypothetical war that may have been legally considered to exist.

1992 – The Katina P is deliberately run aground off Maputo, Mozambique, and 60,000 tons of crude oil spill into the ocean.
2006 – A Palestinian suicide bomber detonates an explosive device in a Tel Aviv restaurant, killing 11 people and injuring 70.
2013 – An explosion at a fertilizer plant in the city of West, Texas, kills 15 people and injures 160 others.
2014 – NASA's Kepler space telescope confirms the discovery of the first Earth-size planet in the habitable zone of another star.
2021 – The funeral of Prince Philip, Duke of Edinburgh, takes place at St George's Chapel, Windsor Castle.

Births

Pre-1600
1277 – Michael IX Palaiologos, Byzantine emperor (d. 1320)
1455 – Andrea Gritti, Doge of Venice (d. 1538)
1497 – Pedro de Valdivia, Spanish conquistador, conquered northern Chile (d. 1553)
1573 – Maximilian I, Elector of Bavaria (d. 1651)
1586 – John Ford, English poet and playwright (d. 1639)
1598 – Giovanni Battista Riccioli, Italian priest and astronomer (d. 1671)

1601–1900
1620 – Marguerite Bourgeoys, French-Canadian nun and saint, founded the Congregation of Notre Dame of Montreal (d. 1700)
1635 – Edward Stillingfleet, British theologian and scholar (d. 1699)
1676 – Frederick I of Sweden (d. 1751)
1683 – Johann David Heinichen, German composer and theorist (d. 1729)
1710 – Henry Erskine, 10th Earl of Buchan, Scottish politician (d. 1767)
1734 – Taksin, King of Thailand (d. 1782)
1741 – Samuel Chase, American lawyer and jurist (d. 1811)
1750 – François de Neufchâteau, French academic and politician, French Minister of the Interior (d. 1828)
1756 – Dheeran Chinnamalai, Indian commander (d. 1805)
1766 – Collin McKinney, American surveyor, merchant, and politician (d. 1861)
1794 – Carl Friedrich Philipp von Martius, German botanist and explorer (d. 1868)
1798 – Étienne Bobillier, French mathematician and academic (d. 1840)
1799 – Eliza Acton, English food writer and poet (d. 1859)
1814 – Josif Pančić, Serbian botanist and academic (d. 1888)
1816 – Thomas Hazlehurst, English architect and philanthropist (d. 1876)
1820 – Alexander Cartwright, American firefighter and inventor of baseball (d. 1892)
1833 – Jean-Baptiste Accolay, Belgian violinist, composer, and conductor (d. 1900)
1837 – J. P. Morgan, American banker and financier, founded J.P. Morgan & Co. (d. 1913)
1842 – Maurice Rouvier, French businessman and politician, 53rd Prime Minister of France (d. 1911)
1849 – William R. Day, American jurist and politician, 36th United States Secretary of State (d. 1923)
1852 – Cap Anson, American baseball player and manager (d. 1922)
1863 – Augustus Edward Hough Love, English mathematician and theorist (d. 1940)
1865 – Ursula Ledóchowska, Polish-Austrian nun and saint, founded the Congregation of the Ursulines of the Agonizing Heart of Jesus (d. 1939)
1866 – Ernest Starling, English physiologist and academic (d. 1927)
1875 – Aleksander Tõnisson, Estonian general and politician, 5th Estonian Minister of War (d. 1941)
1877 – Matsudaira Tsuneo, Japanese diplomat (d. 1949)
1878 – Emil Fuchs, German-American lawyer and businessman (d. 1961)
  1878   – Demetrios Petrokokkinos, Greek tennis player (d. 1942)
1879 – Henri Tauzin, French hurdler (d. 1918)
1882 – Artur Schnabel, Polish pianist and composer (d. 1951)
1888 – Herms Niel, German soldier, trombonist, and composer (d. 1954)
1891 – George Adamski, Polish-American ufologist and author (d. 1965)
1895 – Robert Dean Frisbie, American soldier and author (d. 1948)
1896 – Señor Wences, Spanish-American ventriloquist (d. 1999)
1897 – Nisargadatta Maharaj, Indian philosopher and educator (d. 1981)
  1897   – Thornton Wilder, American novelist and playwright (d. 1975)
  1897   – Edouard Wyss-Dunant, Swiss physician and mountaineer (d. 1983)
1899 – Aleksander Klumberg, Estonian decathlete and coach (d. 1958)

1901–present
1903 – Nicolas Nabokov, Russian-American composer and educator (d. 1978)
  1903   – Gregor Piatigorsky, Ukrainian-American cellist and educator (d. 1976)
  1903   – Morgan Taylor, American hurdler and coach (d. 1975)
1905 – Louis Jean Heydt, American journalist and actor (d. 1960)
  1905   – Arthur Lake, American actor (d. 1987)
1906 – Sidney Garfield, American physician, co-founded Kaiser Permanente (d. 1984)
1909 – Alain Poher, French politician, President of France (d. 1996)
1910 – Evangelos Averoff, Greek historian and politician, Greek Minister of Defence (d. 1990)
  1910   – Ivan Goff, Australian screenwriter and producer (d. 1999)
  1910   – Helenio Herrera, French footballer and manager (d. 1997)
1911 – Hervé Bazin, French author and poet (d. 1996)
  1911   – Lester Rodney, American soldier and journalist (d. 2009)
1912 – Marta Eggerth, Hungarian-American actress and singer (d. 2013)
1914 – George Davis, American art director (d. 1984)
  1914   – Mac Raboy, American illustrator (d. 1967)
1915 – Martin Clemens, Scottish soldier (d. 2009)
  1915   – Joe Foss, American general and politician, 20th Governor of South Dakota (d. 2003)
  1915   – Regina Ghazaryan, Armenian painter (d. 1999)
1916 – Win Maung, 3rd President of Union of Myanmar (d. 1989)
  1916   – A. Thiagarajah, Sri Lankan educator and politician (d. 1981)
  1916   – Sirimavo Bandaranaike, Prime Minister of Sri Lanka, world's first female prime minister (d. 2000)
1918 – William Holden, American actor (d. 1981)
1919 – Gilles Lamontagne, Canadian lieutenant and politician, 24th Lieutenant Governor of Quebec (d. 2016)
  1919   – Chavela Vargas, Costa Rican-Mexican singer-songwriter and actress (d. 2012)
1920 – Edmonde Charles-Roux, French journalist and author (d. 2016)
1923 – Lindsay Anderson, English actor, director, and screenwriter (d. 1994)
  1923   – Solly Hemus, American baseball player, coach, and manager (d. 2017)
  1923   – Neville McNamara, Australian air marshal (d. 2014)
  1923   – Gianni Raimondi, Italian lyric tenor (d. 2008)
  1923   – Harry Reasoner, American soldier and journalist (d. 1991)
1924 – Kenneth Norman Jones, Australian public servant (d. 2022)
  1924   – Donald Richie, American-Japanese author and critic (d. 2013)
1925 – René Moawad, Lebanese lawyer and politician, 13th President of Lebanon (d. 1989)
1926 – Joan Lorring, British actress (d. 2014)
  1926   – Gerry McNeil, Canadian ice hockey player and manager (d. 2004)
1927 – Margot Honecker, East German politician and First Lady (d. 2016)
1928 – Victor Lownes, American businessman (d. 2017)
  1928   – Cynthia Ozick, American short story writer, novelist, and essayist
  1928   – Heinz Putzl, Austrian fencer
  1928   – Fabien Roy, Canadian accountant and politician
1929 – James Last, German-American bassist, composer, and bandleader (d. 2015)
1930 – Chris Barber, English trombonist and bandleader (d. 2021)
1931 – John Barrett, English tennis player and sportscaster
  1931   – Malcolm Browne, American journalist and photographer (d. 2012)
  1931   – Bill Ramsey, German-American singer and actor. (d. 2021)
1934 – Don Kirshner, American songwriter and producer (d. 2011)
  1934   – Peter Morris, Australian-English surgeon and academic
1935 – Bud Paxson, American broadcaster, founded Home Shopping Network and Pax TV (d. 2015)
1936 – Urs Wild, Swiss chemist
1937 – Ronald Hamowy, Canadian historian and academic (d. 2012)
  1937   – Ferdinand Piëch, Austrian-German engineer and businessman (d. 2019)
1938 – Ben Barnes, American businessman and politician, 36th Lieutenant Governor of Texas
  1938   – Doug Lewis, Canadian lawyer and politician, 41st Canadian Minister of Justice
  1938   – Ronald H. Miller, American theologian, author, and academic (d. 2011)
  1938   – Kerry Wendell Thornley, American theorist and author (d. 1988)
1939 – Robert Miller, American art dealer (d. 2011)
1940 – Eric Dancer, English businessman and politician, Lord Lieutenant of Devon
  1940   – Billy Fury, English singer-songwriter (d. 1983)
  1940   – John McCririck, English journalist (d. 2019)
  1940   – Chuck Menville, American animator and screenwriter (d. 1992)
  1940   – Anja Silja, German soprano and actress
  1940   – Agostino Vallini, Italian cardinal and vicar general of Rome
1941 – Lagle Parek, Estonian architect and politician, Estonian Minister of the Interior
1942 – Buster Williams, American jazz bassist 
  1942   – Dnyaneshwar Agashe, Indian businessman and cricketer (d. 2009)
1943 – Richard Allen Epstein, American lawyer, author, and academic
1946 – Clare Francis, English sailor and author
1947 – Nigel Emslie, Lord Emslie, Scottish lawyer and judge
  1947   – Richard Field, English lawyer and judge
  1947   – Sherrie Levine, American photographer
  1947   – Tsutomu Wakamatsu, Japanese baseball player, coach, and manager
1948 – Jan Hammer, Czech pianist, composer, and producer
  1948   – Alice Harden, American educator and politician (d. 2012)
  1948   – Pekka Vasala, Finnish runner
1950 – L. Scott Caldwell, American actress
1951 – Olivia Hussey, Argentinian-English actress
  1951   – Börje Salming, Swedish ice hockey player and businessman (d. 2022)
1952 – Joe Alaskey, American voice actor (d. 2016)
  1952   – Pierre Guité, Canadian ice hockey player
  1952   – John McColl, English general and politician, Lieutenant Governor of Jersey
  1952   – Željko Ražnatović, Serbian commander "Arkan" (d. 2000)
  1952   – John Robertson, Scottish businessman and politician
1954 – Riccardo Patrese, Italian race car driver
  1954   – Roddy Piper, Canadian professional wrestler and actor (d. 2015)
  1954   – Michael Sembello, American singer-songwriter and guitarist
1955 – Todd Lickliter, American basketball player and coach
  1955   – Pete Shelley, English singer-songwriter and guitarist (d. 2018)
  1955   – Mike Stroud, English physician and explorer
1956 – Colin Tyre, Lord Tyre, Scottish lawyer and judge
1957 – Teri Austin, Canadian actress
  1957   – Afrika Bambaataa, American disc jockey
  1957   – Nick Hornby, English novelist, essayist, lyricist, and screenwriter
  1957   – Julia Macur, English lawyer and judge
  1957   – Frank McDonough, British historian
1958 – Laslo Babits, Canadian javelin thrower (d. 2013)
1959 – Sean Bean, English actor
  1959   – Jimmy Mann, Canadian ice hockey player
  1959   – Li Meisu, Chinese shot putter
1960 – Vladimir Polyakov, Russian pole vaulter
1961 – Frank J. Christensen, American labor union leader
  1961   – Norman Cowans, Jamaican-English cricketer
  1961   – Boomer Esiason, American football player and sportscaster
  1961   – Bella Freud, English fashion designer
1962 – Paul Nicholls, English jockey and trainer
1964 – Ken Daneyko, Canadian ice hockey player and sportscaster
  1964   – Maynard James Keenan, American singer-songwriter and producer 
  1964   – Rachel Notley, Canadian politician
  1964   – Lela Rochon, American actress
1966 – Vikram, Indian actor and singer
1967 – Henry Ian Cusick, Peruvian-Scottish actor
  1967   – Kimberly Elise, American actress
  1967   – Marquis Grissom, American baseball player and coach
  1967   – Ian Jones, New Zealand rugby player
  1967   – Barnaby Joyce, Australian politician, 17th Deputy Prime Minister of Australia
  1967   – Liz Phair, American singer-songwriter and guitarist
1968 – Julie Fagerholt, Danish fashion designer
  1968   – Phil Henderson, American basketball player and coach (d. 2013)
  1968   – Eric Lamaze, Canadian jockey
  1968   – Roger Twose, New Zealand cricketer
  1968   – Richie Woodhall, English boxer and trainer
1970 – Redman, American rapper, producer, and actor 
1971 – Claire Sweeney, English actress 
1972 – Gary Bennett, American baseball player
  1972   – Tony Boselli, American football player and sportscaster
  1972   – Jennifer Garner, American actress 
  1972   – Muttiah Muralitharan, Sri Lankan cricketer
  1972   – Yuichi Nishimura, Japanese footballer and referee
  1972   – Terran Sandwith, Canadian ice hockey player
1973 – Katrin Koov, Estonian architect
  1973   – Brett Maher, Australian basketball player and sportscaster
  1973   – Theo Ratliff, American basketball player
1974 – Mikael Åkerfeldt, Swedish singer-songwriter, guitarist, and producer 
  1974   – Victoria Beckham, English singer and fashion designer 
1975 – Heidi Alexander, English politician
  1975   – Travis Roy, American ice hockey player (d. 2020)
1976 – Maurice Wignall, Jamaican hurdler and long jumper
1977 – Chad Hedrick, American speed skater
  1977   – Frederik Magle, Danish composer, organist, and pianist
1978 – Monika Bergmann-Schmuderer, German skier
  1978   – Lindsay Hartley, American actress
  1978   – Jason White, Scottish rugby player
1979 – Eric Brewer, Canadian ice hockey player
  1979   – Marija Šestak, Serbian-Slovenian triple jumper
1980 – Fabián Vargas, Colombian footballer
  1980   – Curtis Woodhouse, English footballer, boxer, and manager
1981 – Jenny Meadows, English runner
  1981   – Hanna Pakarinen, Finnish singer-songwriter
  1981   – Ryan Raburn, American baseball player
  1981   – Chris Thompson, English runner
  1981   – Zhang Yaokun, Chinese footballer
1982 – Brad Boyes, Canadian ice hockey player
  1982   – Chuck Kobasew, Canadian ice hockey player
1983 – Stanislav Chistov, Russian ice hockey player
  1983   – Roberto Jiménez, Peruvian footballer
  1983   – Andrea Marcato, Italian rugby player
1984 – Pablo Sebastián Álvarez, Argentinian footballer
  1984   – Jed Lowrie, American baseball player
  1984   – Raffaele Palladino, Italian footballer
1985 – Rooney Mara, American actress
  1985   – Luke Mitchell, Australian actor and model
  1985   – Jo-Wilfried Tsonga, French tennis player
1986 – Romain Grosjean, French race car driver
1988 – Takahiro Moriuchi, Japanese singer-songwriter 
1989 – Paraskevi Papachristou, Greek triple jumper
  1989   – Avi Kaplan, singer and songwriter
1990 – Jonathan Brown, Welsh footballer
1992 – Lachlan Maranta, Australian rugby league footballer
1994 – Alanna Goldie, Canadian fencer
1996 – Lorna Fitzgerald, British actress
  1996   – Caitlin Parker, Australian boxer
1998 – Suppapong Udomkaewkanjana, Thai actor and singer

Deaths

Pre-1600
 485 – Proclus, Greek mathematician and philosopher (b. 412)
 617 – Donnán of Eigg, Irish priest and saint
 648 – Xiao, empress of the Sui Dynasty
 744 – Al-Walid II, Umayyad caliph (b. 706)
 818 – Bernard of Italy, Frankish king (b. 797)
 858 – Benedict III, pope of the Catholic Church
1071 – Manuel Komnenos, Byzantine military commander (b. c. 1045)
1080 – Harald III of Denmark (b. 1041)
1111 – Robert of Molesme, Christian saint and abbot (b. 1027)
1298 – Árni Þorláksson, Icelandic bishop (b. 1237)
1321 – Infanta Branca of Portugal, daughter of King Afonso III of Portugal (b. 1259)
1331 – Robert de Vere, 6th Earl of Oxford, English nobleman (b. 1257)
1344 – Constantine II, King of Armenia
1355 – Marin Falier, Doge of Venice (b. 1285)
1427 – John IV, Duke of Brabant (b. 1403)
1539 – George, Duke of Saxony (b. 1471)
1574 – Joachim Camerarius, German scholar and translator (b. 1500)

1601–1900
1669 – Antonio Bertali, Italian violinist and composer (b. 1605)
1680 – Kateri Tekakwitha, Mohawk-born Native American saint (b. 1656)
1695 – Juana Inés de la Cruz, Mexican poet and scholar (b. 1651)
1696 – Marie de Rabutin-Chantal, marquise de Sévigné, French author (b. 1626)
1711 – Joseph I, Holy Roman Emperor (b. 1678)
1713 – David Hollatz, Polish pastor and theologian (b. 1648)
1764 – Johann Mattheson, German lexicographer and composer (b. 1681)
1790 – Benjamin Franklin, American inventor, publisher, and politician, 6th President of Pennsylvania (b. 1706)
1799 – Richard Jupp, English surveyor and architect (b. 1728)
1840 – Hannah Webster Foster, American journalist and author (b. 1758)
1843 – Samuel Morey, American engineer (b. 1762)
1882 – George Jennings, English engineer and plumber, invented the Flush toilet (b. 1810)
1888 – E. G. Squier, American archaeologist and journalist (b. 1821)
1892 – Alexander Mackenzie, Scottish-Canadian politician, 2nd Prime Minister of Canada (b. 1822)

1901–present
1921 – Manwel Dimech, Maltese journalist, author, and philosopher (b. 1860)
1923 – Laurence Ginnell, Irish lawyer and politician (b. 1852)
1930 – Alexander Golovin, Russian painter and stage designer (b. 1863)
1933 – Kote Marjanishvili, Georgian director and playwright (b. 1872)
1936 – Charles Ruijs de Beerenbrouck, Dutch lawyer and politician, 28th Prime Minister of the Netherlands (b. 1873)
1942 – Jean Baptiste Perrin, French-American physicist and chemist, Nobel Prize laureate (b. 1870)
1944 – J. T. Hearne, English cricketer and coach (b. 1867)
  1944   – Dimitrios Psarros, Greek lieutenant, founded the National and Social Liberation (b. 1893)
1946 – Juan Bautista Sacasa, Nicaraguan medical doctor, politician and 20th President of Nicaragua (b. 1874)
1948 – Kantarō Suzuki, Japanese admiral and politician, 42nd Prime Minister of Japan (b. 1868)
1954 – Lucrețiu Pătrășcanu, Romanian lawyer and politician, Romanian Minister of Justice (b. 1900)
1960 – Eddie Cochran, American singer-songwriter and guitarist (b. 1938)
  1961   – Elda Anderson, American physicist and health researcher (b. 1899)
1967 – Red Allen, American singer and trumpet player (b. 1908)
1975 – Sarvepalli Radhakrishnan, Indian philosopher and politician, 2nd President of India (b. 1888)
1976 – Henrik Dam, Danish biochemist and physiologist, Nobel Prize laureate (b. 1895)
1977 – William Conway, Irish cardinal (b. 1913)
1983 – Felix Pappalardi, American singer-songwriter, bass player, and producer (b. 1939)
1984 – Claude Provost, Canadian-American ice hockey player (b. 1933)
1987 – Cecil Harmsworth King, English publisher (b. 1901)
  1987   – Dick Shawn, American actor (b. 1923)
1988 – Louise Nevelson, Ukrainian-American sculptor and educator (b. 1900)
1990 – Ralph Abernathy, American minister and activist (b. 1936)
1993 – Turgut Özal, Turkish engineer and politician, 8th president of Turkey (b. 1927)
1994 – Roger Wolcott Sperry, American psychologist and biologist, Nobel Prize laureate (b. 1913)
1995 – Frank E. Resnik, American sergeant and businessman (b. 1928)
1996 – Piet Hein, Danish poet and mathematician (b. 1905)
1997 – Chaim Herzog, Israeli general, lawyer, and politician, 6th President of Israel (b. 1918)
1998 – Linda McCartney, American photographer, activist, and musician (b. 1941)
2003 – Robert Atkins, American physician and cardiologist, created the Atkins diet (b. 1930)
  2003   – H. B. Bailey, American race car driver (b. 1936)
  2003   – John Paul Getty, Jr., American-English philanthropist (b. 1932)
  2003   – Earl King, American blues singer, guitarist and songwriter (b. 1934)
  2003   – Yiannis Latsis, Greek businessman (b. 1910)
2004 – Edmond Pidoux, Swiss author and poet (b. 1908)
2006 – Jean Bernard, French physician and haematologist (b. 1907)
  2006   – Scott Brazil, American director and producer (b. 1955)
  2006   – Henderson Forsythe, American actor (b. 1917)
2007 – Kitty Carlisle, American actress, singer, socialite and game show panelist (b. 1910)
2008 – Aimé Césaire, Caribbean-French poet and politician (b. 1913)
  2008   – Danny Federici, American organist and accordion player (b. 1950)
2011 – Eric Gross, Austrian-Australian pianist and composer (b. 1926)
  2011   – Michael Sarrazin, Canadian actor (b. 1940)
  2011   – Robert Vickrey, American artist and author (b. 1926)
2012 – Leila Berg, English journalist and author (b. 1917)
  2012   – J. Quinn Brisben, American educator and politician (b. 1934)
  2012   – Dimitris Mitropanos, Greek singer (b. 1948)
  2012   – Nityananda Mohapatra, Indian journalist, poet, and politician (b. 1912)
  2012   – Jonathan V. Plaut, American rabbi and author (b. 1942)
  2012   – Stanley Rogers Resor, American soldier, lawyer, and politician, 9th United States Secretary of the Army (b. 1917)
2013 – Carlos Graça, São Toméan politician, Prime Minister of São Tomé and Príncipe (b. 1931)
  2013   – Bi Kidude, Tanzanian Taarab singer (b. ≈1910)
  2013   – Yngve Moe, Norwegian bass player and songwriter (b. 1957)
  2013   – V. S. Ramadevi, Indian politician, 13th Governor of Karnataka (b. 1934)
2014 – Gabriel García Márquez, Colombian journalist and author, Nobel Prize laureate (b. 1927)
  2014   – Bernat Klein, Serbian-Scottish fashion designer and painter (b. 1922)
  2014   – Wojciech Leśnikowski, Polish–American architect and academic (b. 1938)
  2014   – Karpal Singh, Malaysian lawyer and politician (b. 1940)
2015 – Robert P. Griffin, American soldier, lawyer, and politician (b. 1923)
  2015   – Scotty Probasco, American businessman and philanthropist (b. 1928)
  2015   – Jeremiah J. Rodell, American general (b. 1921)
  2015   – A. Alfred Taubman, American businessman and philanthropist (b. 1924)
2016 – Chyna, American wrestler (b. 1969)
  2016   – Doris Roberts, American actress (b. 1925)
2018 – Barbara Bush, former First Lady of the United States (b. 1925)
  2018   – Carl Kasell, American radio personality (b. 1934)
2019 – Alan García, Peruvian lawyer and politician, 61st and 64th President of Peru (b. 1949)
2022 – Radu Lupu, Romanian pianist (b. 1945)

Holidays and observances
Christian feast day:
Kateri Tekakwitha (Canada)
Stephen Harding
April 17 (Eastern Orthodox liturgics)
Evacuation Day (Syria), celebrates the recognition of the independence of Syria from France in 1946.
FAO Day (Iraq)
Flag Day (American Samoa)
Malbec World Day 
Women's Day (Gabon)
World Hemophilia Day

References

External links

 BBC: On This Day
 
 Historical Events on April 17

Days of the year
April